Arthur Sanders (8 May 1901 – 26 September 1983) was an English teacher and professional footballer who played for London University, Peterborough & Fletton United, Northfleet United, Tottenham Hotspur and Clapton Orient.

Early life 
Sanders was educated at Raynham Road school and the Latymer School in Edmonton and played football for both schools. At the end of World War I he joined the Mercantile and Marine. During a visit to Argentina he found time to turn out for local club Rosario Central.

Football career 
Sanders played for the London University before joining Peterborough & Fletton United where he was a member of the side which won the Southern Football League title in 1923–24. Sanders a talented striker joined Tottenham Hotspur as an amateur in December 1923. He went on to play for club's "nursery" team Northfleet United. Sanders returned to Tottenham and made his debut for the Lilywhites in February 1927. He went on to make 13 appearances and score seven goals for the North London club. Sanders re-joined Northfleet and stayed a further four years at the Kent club. In 1929 he signed for Clapton Orient and found the net on six occasions in 56 matches in all competitions between 1929 and 1932. Sanders retired from professional football in 1933.

Post-footballing career 
Sanders trained at the London University to become a teacher. In  his first spell at Northfleet United he also taught at the Silver Street school in Edmonton. After retiring from competitive football in 1933 he returned to teaching and took up a post at the Raglan school in the Bush Hill Park area of Enfield and later became headmaster until the 1960s. He later acted as an administrator for the Edmonton and District football association.

Death 
Sanders died on 26 September 1983 at Winchmore Hill.

References 

1901 births
1983 deaths
Footballers from Edmonton, London
English footballers
Association football forwards
Peterborough & Fletton United F.C. players
English Football League players
Northfleet United F.C. players
Tottenham Hotspur F.C. players
Leyton Orient F.C. players
People educated at The Latymer School